Polish Mountain  is located in Allegany County, Maryland, United States. It borders on Town Creek Tributary on the east, north of Town Creek, and extending northeastward into Pennsylvania.

In February 2011, nine Maryland State Senators introduced a bill to rename Polish Mountain and Negro Mountain. All four Western Maryland state representatives testified against the proposed bill.  The bill was voted down in committee.

References 

 United States Geological Survey
 Maryland Geological survey

Landforms of Allegany County, Maryland
Mountains of Maryland
Polish-American culture in Maryland